Rhine is a town in Sheboygan County, Wisconsin, United States. The population was 2,244 at the 2000 census. The village of Elkhart Lake is located within the town. The unincorporated community of Rhine Center is also located in the town. The town is included in the Sheboygan, Wisconsin Metropolitan Statistical Area.

History
German settlers named the town after the Rhine River in Europe.

Geography
According to the United States Census Bureau, the town has a total area of 34.6 square miles (89.7 km2), of which, 33.7 square miles (87.3 km2) of it is land and 0.9 square miles (2.4 km2) of it (2.71%) is water.

Demographics
As of the census of 2000, there were 2,244 people, 829 households, and 650 families residing in the town. The population density was 66.6 people per square mile (25.7/km2). There were 961 housing units at an average density of 28.5 per square mile (11.0/km2). The racial makeup of the town was 98.75% White, 0.04% African American, 0.27% Native American, 0.27% Asian, 0.09% Pacific Islander, 0.13% from other races, and 0.45% from two or more races. Hispanic or Latino of any race were 0.40% of the population.

There were 829 households, out of which 33.4% had children under the age of 18 living with them, 73.8% were married couples living together, 3.1% had a female householder with no husband present, and 21.5% were non-families. 17.4% of all households were made up of individuals, and 5.2% had someone living alone who was 65 years of age or older. The average household size was 2.71 and the average family size was 3.08.

In the town, the population was spread out, with 24.6% under the age of 18, 7.0% from 18 to 24, 28.6% from 25 to 44, 30.4% from 45 to 64, and 9.4% who were 65 years of age or older. The median age was 40 years. For every 100 females, there were 104.9 males. For every 100 females age 18 and over, there were 106.7 males.

The median income for a household in the town was $62,500, and the median income for a family was $66,471. Males had a median income of $40,942 versus $27,036 for females. The per capita income for the town was $27,059. About 0.3% of families and 1.4% of the population were below the poverty line, including none of those under age 18 and 2.4% of those age 65 or over.

Notable people

 Philip H. Kasper, farmer and businessman
 Otto A. La Budde, Wisconsin State Representative and businessman, was born in the town
 George W. Wolff, politician and farmer

See also
Quasius Quarry

References

External links
Town of Rhine

Towns in Sheboygan County, Wisconsin
Towns in Wisconsin